Vexitomina radulaeformis is a species of sea snail, a marine gastropod mollusk in the family Horaiclavidae.

Description
Charles Hedley (1922) was of the opinion that this species is unknown to Australian conchologists ; apparently it resembles Vexitomina metcalfei (Angas, 1867).  The type is probably in the Godefffoy Museum, Hamburg . He described it as Inquisitor radulaeformis

Distribution
This marine species is endemic to Australia and occurs in the Bass Strait, Tasmania.

References

 Weinkauff, H.C. 1876. Das Genus Pleurotoma. pp. 49–136 in Küster, H.C., Martini, F.W. & Chemnitz, J.H. (eds). Systematisches Conchylien-Cabinet von Martini und Chemnitz. Nürnberg : Bauer & Raspe Vol. 4.

External links
  Tucker, J.K. 2004 Catalog of recent and fossil turrids (Mollusca: Gastropoda). Zootaxa 682:1–1295

radulaeformis
Gastropods described in 1876
Gastropods of Australia